Tsusumisa Kikuchi (born 13 June 1948) is a Japanese biathlete. He competed in the 20 km individual event at the 1980 Winter Olympics.

References

1948 births
Living people
Japanese male biathletes
Olympic biathletes of Japan
Biathletes at the 1980 Winter Olympics
Sportspeople from Hokkaido
20th-century Japanese people